Lash or Lashing may refer to: 
 Eyelash
 Whiplash (disambiguation)
 Lashing (ropework), a form of connecting solid objects tightly using rope or cord
 Flagellation, a form of torture or punishment involving a whip
 Backlash (engineering), clearance between mating components

Films
 The Lash (1916 film), a 1916 American silent film directed by James Young
 The Lash (1930 film), an American western film
 The Lash (1934 film), a British drama film

People
 Lash (surname)
 Lash LaRue (1917–1996), American actor

Places
 Lash, Ontario, Canada
 Lash, Gilan, Iran
 Lash, Kohgiluyeh and Boyer-Ahmad, Iran
 Lash, Mazandaran, Iran

Other uses
 Lash (album), 1993 EP by The Jesus Lizard
 Lash (band), an all-female alternative/punk rock band from Perth, Australia
 Lash (comics), a fictional character in Marvel Comics and Marvel's Agents of S.H.I.E.L.D.
 Lash (Sky High), a character in the 2005 American comedy film
 Lashing (ropework), a means of attaching two or more objects with rope
 Lighter aboard ship, a system of water transport
 Littoral Airborne Sensor/Hyperspectral, an imaging system developed by the United States Navy
 A lashing point such as a D-ring

See also
 Lash Out (disambiguation)
 The Lash (disambiguation)
 Lashes (disambiguation)